The 1980 United Bank Classic, also known as the Denver WCT, was a men's tennis tournament played on indoor carpet courts in Denver, Colorado in the United States that was part of the 1980 Grand Prix circuit. It was the ninth edition of the tournament and took place from February 18 through February 24, 1980. Second-seeded Gene Mayer won the singles competition.

Finals

Singles
 Gene Mayer defeated  Victor Amaya 6–4, 6–1
 It was Mayer's 1st singles title of the year and the 3rd of his career.

Doubles
 Steve Denton /  Kevin Curren defeated  Wojciech Fibak /  Heinz Günthardt 7–5, 6–2

References

External links
 ITF tournament edition details

United Bank Classic
Indoor tennis tournaments
United Bank Classic
United Bank Classic
United Bank Classic